The Tshuapa River or Rivière Tshwapa is a river in Democratic Republic of the Congo, the main tributary of the Busira River.

Course

The river rises in the south of the Sankuru Nature Reserve and meanders north-northwest to Elinga-Mpango and on to Bondo, from where flows in a west-northwest direction to Boende, above its confluence with the Lomela River to form the Busira River.

Environment

The confluence of the Tshuapa and Lomela rivers is in the heart of the central depression of the Congo Basin.
Annual rainfall averages , with no dry season.
Throughout parts of the Tshuapa catchment 20–25% of the land is subject to flooding.

Navigation

The section of the river from its mouth up to Ikela, at  can be navigated all year round by 350 tom barges, although a few tight bends must be negotiated.
From Ikela up to Bondo at  it can carry 40 ton barges all year round.
From Bondo to Elinga-Mpango the river narrows and winds more, and is not navigable all year round.

References

Sources

Rivers of the Democratic Republic of the Congo